Dachstein is a commune in the Bas-Rhin department in Grand Est in north-eastern France. Of note is Château Hervé. Dachstein station has rail connections to Strasbourg and Molsheim.

Population

See also
 Communes of the Bas-Rhin department

References

Communes of Bas-Rhin
Bas-Rhin communes articles needing translation from French Wikipedia